is a Japanese former Nippon Professional Baseball catcher.

References 

1976 births
Living people
Baseball people from Osaka Prefecture
Japanese baseball players
Nippon Professional Baseball catchers
Yakult Swallows players
Tokyo Yakult Swallows players
Japanese baseball coaches
Nippon Professional Baseball coaches